Aretusi is a surname. Notable people with the surname include:

Alessandro Aretusi, 17th century Italian painter
Cesare Aretusi (1549–1612), Italian painter
Pellegrino Aretusi ( 1460–1523), Italian painter 

Italian-language surnames